Rafiz Abu Bakar (born 26 June 1980 in Alor Star, Kedah)  is a Malaysian footballer who is currently unattached.

Previously, he played for Sarawak FA in the 2010 Malaysia Premier League.

He was one of bright youngster produced by the Malaysian youth coaches at the academy at FAM and he received a six-month training with Bundesliga champions, FC Bayern Munich when he was 16. After returning from training stints in Munich, Germany he was drafted to Kedah youth and President Cup team under guidance by current Kedah senior head coach, Mohd Azraai Khor Abdullah.

On 2004, he was loaned to Perlis FA for two seasons before returned to his hometown where he had limited playing time due to injuries.

References

External links
 Malaysian Premier League Team Info

Malaysian footballers
Kedah Darul Aman F.C. players
Sarawak FA players
Perlis FA players
Living people
1980 births
People from Alor Setar
Malaysian people of Malay descent
Association football midfielders